Helcystogramma delocosma is a moth in the family Gelechiidae. It was described by Edward Meyrick in 1936. It is known from Indonesia (Java).

The larvae feed on Micromelum pubescens.

References

Moths described in 1936
delocosma
Moths of Indonesia